Valdemar Sadrifar (born 9 March 2001) is a Danish footballer who plays as a midfielder for German NOFV-Oberliga Nord club Rostocker FC.

Club career

Sadrifar made his Danish Superliga debut for Vejle on 18 July 2021 against Randers.

He joined Manhattan SC in USL League Two for the 2022 season, scoring a goal on his debut on 25 May 2022 against FC Motown.

Personal life
Sadrifar was born in Aarhus to a Danish mother and an Iranian father.

Career statistics

Club

References

External links
 

2001 births
Footballers from Aarhus
Danish people of Iranian descent
Sportspeople of Iranian descent
Living people
Danish men's footballers
Association football midfielders
FC Sydvest 05 players
Vejle Boldklub players
Hedensted IF players
Danish 2nd Division players
Danish Superliga players
USL League Two players
Oberliga (football) players
Danish expatriate men's footballers
Expatriate soccer players in the United States
Danish expatriate sportspeople in the United States
Expatriate footballers in Germany
Danish expatriate sportspeople in Germany